Sandeep Rajora is an Indian model and actor. Model from the famous song "Raat Din Tere Khayal Aane Lage"

Career
Rajora has appeared in a number of television serials including Balaji Telefilms's Kkusum as Siddharth Kanwar. He was the winner of AXN's Fear Factor India, shown on Sony Entertainment Television.

Rajora started modelling in 2001, winning the Gladrags Manhunt Contest 2001, after which he returned to Mumbai to pursue a career as a model. He went on to model for Signature Whiskey and then for a wide range of brands. He also played the role of Kulbhushan Bhalla, Samar's father in Balaji Telefilms daily fiction show Dil Hi Toh Hai on Sony Entertainment Television.

Personal life
Rajora attended the Army Public School. He holds an MBA from University of Pune and worked with Times Bank in Goa for a brief period, before moving to Cimatron in Pune. He is a state-level squash player.

Rajora married Roshi Rana in Delhi on 9 November 2008. They have a son.

Television

References

External links
 

Indian male models
Indian male television actors
Male actors in Hindi television
Living people
People from Delhi
Male actors from New Delhi
Year of birth missing (living people)